Austari-Jökulsá ("easterly glacier river") is a glacial river in the north of Iceland. After the confluence with Vestari-Jökulsá it forms the Héraðsvötn.

Name
The name means Eastern Glacial River, in comparison to the Western Glacial River (Vestari-Jökulsá) which is situated more to the west.

Course of the river
Some glacial outlet streams of the big ice cap Hofsjökull confluence up in the highland to form the glacial river Austari-Jökulsá. The river discharge is rather important with 60-100 m3/sec in the summer and 20-30 m3/sec in wintertime. A flood went up to 320 m3/sec.

Because of this, the river which has no waterfalls had a bad reputation and was/is very difficult to ford.

In 1970, a bridge was built near Laugafell.

Sports

Today, the river with its fierce currents is popular for rafting tours.

References

Rivers of Iceland